The Purple Line is a proposed line of the Dubai Metro network in Dubai, United Arab Emirates.  The purple line will run between Dubai International Airport to Al Maktoum International Airport, along Al Khail Road. Announced in 2007, construction of the line had not started yet as of February 2023, and news reports in July 2011 claimed that the line faces cancellation.

It will have about eight stations along its route, three with check-in facilities. However The Dubai Airports claimed that this was unfeasible as it did not pass through many localities. However they suggested opting for a "central terminal" similar to ones in the US where trains leave from inside the airport to the other airport with trains also leaving to the city. The RTA have taken this into consideration.

Statistics

See also

Green Line (Dubai Metro)
Red Line (Dubai Metro)
Blue Line (Dubai Metro)

References

External links
Zawya.com
Arabianbusiness.com
Gulfnews.com
Ameinfo.com

Proposed public transport in Asia
Dubai Metro
 
ar:الخط الأخضر (مترو دبي)
id:Jalur Hijau (Dubai Metro)